Ramat Raziel (lit. Raziel Heights) is a moshav in central Israel. Located in the centre of the Jerusalem corridor, it falls under the jurisdiction of Mateh Yehuda Regional Council.

History
The village was established in 1948, and was named after David Raziel, a commander of the Irgun.

It is located on land belonging to the depopulated Palestinian  village of  Kasla, Jerusalem.

References

Moshavim
Populated places established in 1948
Populated places in Jerusalem District
1948 establishments in Israel